The TSV Neudrossenfeld is a German association football club from the town of Neudrossenfeld, Bavaria.

The club's greatest success came in 2014 when it qualified for the northern division of the Bayernliga, the fifth tier of the German football league system.

History
For most of its history the club, formed on 21 June 1924, has been a non-descript amateur side in local Bavarian football. The club first rose above local Kreisliga football in 1990 when it won promotion to the Bezirksliga Oberfranken-Ost. It spent four seasons in the lower half of the table before being relegated again in 1994. The club promptly returned to the Bezirksliga in 1995 but again lasted for only four seasons before suffering another relegation in 1999. Neudrossenfeld won its third promotion to the Bezirksliga in 2004 for a third stint of four seasons. This time however the club was a stronger side and capped the four seasons with a league championship in 2008.

Promoted to the tier seven Bezirksoberliga Oberfranken TSV finished runners-up in its first season there and was immediately promoted another level, now to the Landesliga Bayern-Nord.

The club played in the Landesliga for the next five seasons, the first three in the Landesliga Nord with average success. In 2012 this league was disbanded when the Landesligas were expanded from three to five divisions. Neudrossenfeld was grouped in the Landesliga Bayern-Nordost where it came sixth in 2013, followed by a league championship the season after.

The later allowed the club to move up to the Bayernliga for the first time, competing in the northern division in 2014–15. After a seventeenth place in 2014–15 the club had to enter the relegation round where it lost to SpVgg Selbitz and was relegated.

Honours
The club's honours:
 Landesliga Bayern-Nordost
 Champions: 2014
 Bezirksoberliga Oberfranken
 Runners-up: 2009
 Bezirksliga Oberfranken-Ost
 Champions: 2008

Recent seasons
The recent season-by-season performance of the club:

With the introduction of the Bezirksoberligas in 1988 as the new fifth tier, below the Landesligas, all leagues below dropped one tier. With the introduction of the Regionalligas in 1994 and the 3. Liga in 2008 as the new third tier, below the 2. Bundesliga, all leagues below dropped one tier. With the establishment of the Regionalliga Bayern as the new fourth tier in Bavaria in 2012 the Bayernliga was split into a northern and a southern division, the number of Landesligas expanded from three to five and the Bezirksoberligas abolished. All leagues from the Bezirksligas onwards were elevated one tier.

Key

References

External links
 Official team site  
 Das deutsche Fußball-Archiv  historical German domestic league tables
 Manfreds Fussball Archiv  Tables and results from the Bavarian amateur leagues
 TSV Neudrossenfeld at Weltfussball.de  

Football clubs in Germany
Football clubs in Bavaria
Football in Upper Franconia
Association football clubs established in 1924
1924 establishments in Germany